Agama picticauda, the Peter's rock agama or African redhead agama, is a species of agamid lizard. It is native to West Africa.

Range
Agama picticauda occurs in West Africa, from Mauritania in the west to Nigeria in the east.

Introduced range
Agama picticauda was first introduced to Florida in 1976 through the pet trade. First colonizing Homestead and other areas in Miami-Dade. Since then it has spread elsewhere in South Florida including the Keys. Introduced populations also exist in La Réunion and the Comoros, with single specimen(s) reported from Cap Verde, Madeira, and Madagascar.

Sightings in South Florida rapidly increased at the end of 2020, indicating that the population has recently also increased rapidly.

References

picticauda
Agamid lizards of Africa
Reptiles of West Africa
Taxa named by Wilhelm Peters
Reptiles described in 1877